Andrei Vladimirovich Panin (28 May 1962 – 6 March 2013) was a Nika Award-winner Russian actor appearing in film and television, and a director.

Biography

Early life
Panin was born on 28 May 1962, in Novosibirsk, Russian SFSR, Soviet Union; the son of Agnessa (née Berezovsky), and Dimitri Alexandrei Panin. Two years later, the family moved to Chelyabinsk. Then, when Andrew was six years old – in Kemerovo, where he lived for 16 years.

Acting career
Panin was well known for the hit television detective show Kamenskaya. In 2000, he had lead roles in both Valery Akhadov's Don't Offend the Women and Pavel Lungin's The Wedding, as well as Alexander Atanesyan's action thriller 24 Hours. He won the best actor prize at the Golden Ram film festival for his part in The Wedding. Panin made his first screen appearance in the movie Straightway, but it was his performances in Maxim Pezhemsky's Mama, Don't Cry and Denis Yevstigneev's Mama that brought the actor renown.

Before becoming a screen regular, he was a stage actor at the Minusinsky theater, where he worked after graduating from the Culture Institute in Kemerovo. Although he had initially planned to attend the Culinary Institute, Panin went on to further his education as an actor, graduating from Moscow's legendary MKhAT in 1991 and taking up residence at the MKhAT Chekhov theater with his wife, Natalya Rogozhina. His stage work includes Three Sisters (Soleny), The Miserly Knight, Marriage, Deadly Number, and a private production of Winter. Panin often acts in Oleg Tabakov's productions.

Personal life
Panin lived in Moscow, Russia with his wife, Natalya Rogozhkina. He was found dead in his apartment on 7 March 2013, lying on the floor with a head wound.

Selected filmography
1998  —  Mama Don't Cry (Мама, не горюй) as sailor
1999 / 2011 —   Kamenskaya (Каменская) as Stasov
2000  —  The Wedding (Свадьба) as Garkusha
2001  —  Poisons or the World History of Poisoning (Яды, или Всемирная история отравлений) as Cesare Borgia
2002  —  Spartacus and Kalashnikov (Спартак и Калашников)
2003  —  The Suit (Шик) as Botya
2002  —  The Brigade: Law of Lawless (Бригада) as Vladimir Kaverin
2005  —  Dead Man's Bluff (Жмурки) as architect
2005  — Mama Don't Cry 2 (Мама, не горюй-2) as sailor
2005  — Shadowboxing (Бой с тенью) as Valiyev
2007  — Shadowboxing 2: Revenge (Бой с тенью 2: Реванш) as Valiyev
2007  — Vanechka (Ванечка)
2007  — Crime and Punishment (Преступление и наказание) as Porfiriy Petrovich2007  — Gagarin's Grandson (also Director) as Tolyan Titov2010  — Kandagar (Кандагар) as Alexander Gotov2010  — Burnt by the Sun 2 (Утомлённые солнцем 2) as Kravets2011  — Generation P (Generation P) as Kolya2011 —  Shadowboxing 3: Last Round (Бой с тенью 3D: Последний раунд) as Valiyev2011  — Vysotsky. Thank You For Being Alive (Высоцкий. Спасибо, что живой) as Dr. Anatoly Nefedov2012  — Breakaway (Отрыв) as Igor Grumel2012  — Redemption (Ископление) as Fedor 
2012  — The Horde (Орда) as khan Tini Beg2013 —  Sherlock Holmes (Шерлок Холмс) as Dr. Watson2014  — Hetaera of Major Sokolov (Гетеры майора Соколова) as Andrei Sokolov''

References

External links

1962 births
2013 deaths
Honored Artists of the Russian Federation
State Prize of the Russian Federation laureates
Recipients of the Nika Award
Russian male film actors
Russian male television actors
Russian male stage actors
Russian film directors
Soviet male actors
Moscow Art Theatre School alumni
Academic staff of Moscow Art Theatre School
People from Novosibirsk
Burials in Troyekurovskoye Cemetery